Kamala Khan is a fictional character portrayed by Iman Vellani in the Marvel Cinematic Universe (MCU) media franchise—based on the Marvel Comics character of the same name—commonly known by her alias, Ms. Marvel. Khan is a teenage Pakistani-American mutant from Jersey City, New Jersey who idolizes Carol Danvers and unlocks her dormant cosmic energy powers from the Noor dimension.

Khan first appeared in the Disney+ television miniseries Ms. Marvel (2022). She will return in the upcoming film The Marvels (2023), while an alternate version of the character will appear in the Disney+ animated series Marvel Zombies (2024).

Concept and creation 

In November 2013, Marvel Comics announced that Kamala Khan, a teenage American Muslim from Jersey City, New Jersey, would take over the comic book series Ms. Marvel beginning in February 2014. The series, written by G. Willow Wilson and drawn by Adrian Alphona, marked the first time a Muslim character headlined a book at Marvel Comics. The conception of Kamala Khan came about during a conversation between Marvel editors Sana Amanat and Stephen Wacker. Amanat said, "I was telling him [Wacker] some crazy anecdote about my childhood, growing up as a Muslim American. He found it hilarious." The pair then told Wilson about the concept and Wilson became eager to jump aboard the project. Amanat said that the series came from a "desire to explore the Muslim-American diaspora from an authentic perspective." Artist Jamie McKelvie based Khan's design on his redesign of Carol Danvers as Captain Marvel and on Dave Cockrum's design of the original Ms. Marvel. Amanat requested that the design "reflected the Captain Marvel legacy, and also her story and her background." Amanat stated that Khan's costume was influenced by the shalwar kameez. They wanted the costume to represent her cultural identity, but did not want her to wear a hijab, because the majority of teenage Pakistani-American girls do not wear one. Amanat also stated that they wanted the character to look "less like a sex siren" to appeal to a more vocal female readership.

Marvel knew that they wanted a young Muslim girl, but stated that she could be from any place of origin and have any background. Wilson ultimately chose to create a Desi girl from Jersey City, which sits across the Hudson River from Manhattan and has been referred to as New York City's "Sixth borough". It therefore forms an important part of Khan's identity and the narrative journey of her character since most of Marvel Comics' stories are set in Manhattan. Wilson explains, "A huge aspect of Ms. Marvel is being a 'second string hero' in the 'second string city' and having to struggle out of the pathos and emotion that can give a person." The series not only explores Khan's conflicts with supervillains but also explores conflicts with Khan's home and religious duties. Amanat later revealed that when she and Wilson were creating Khan, the character was originally going to be a mutant before they changed her to being an Inhuman.

In September 2016, Marvel Entertainment's Creative Consultant Joe Quesada stated that Ms. Marvel would appear in "other media" as result of the character's quick success amongst readers, which he noted "doesn't happen a lot" and acknowledged that it probably would not have happened ten years ago. Marvel Studios President Kevin Feige said in May 2018 that a Marvel Cinematic Universe (MCU) project based on Kamala Khan was "in the works", and would follow the release of the film Captain Marvel (2019) as Khan is inspired by that film's title character Carol Danvers. The Ms. Marvel television series was officially announced at the 2019 D23 conference. In September 2020, newcomer Iman Vellani was cast in the lead role of Khan. Kamala Khan co-creator Amanat, who is also serving as a co-executive producer on the television series, highlighted Vellani's Zoom audition which revealed that Vellani is an Avengers fangirl like Khan. Amanat said, "She showed me every corner of her room, and it was covered with Avengers. Then she said, 'Oh wait, I'm not done', opened up her closet, and there was more Marvel everywhere".

Characterization 
Khan is an aspiring artist, avid gamer, and writes superhero fan fiction about the heroes she admires. She struggles to fit in at her high school and at home. Amanat said that Khan "isn't your traditional Avenger. She's not as slick and suave as some superheroes. It's not like when Captain America throws his shield and it comes back. She's all over the place".

Appearance and special effects 

In the comics, Khan is classified as a "polymorph" with moves that "are basically Ant-Man and Mister Fantastic's combined". When asked in August 2019 about the transition of Khan from comic book to live-action, G. Willow Wilson stated, "I think there're some characters who are very much set up for the big screen; they're very naturally sort of cinematic. But with Ms. Marvel, we really weren't interested in creating something that had very obvious film potential. [...] She's got very comic booky powers. God bless them trying to bring that to live action; I don't know how that's going to work out in a way that doesn't look really creepy". In the Ms. Marvel television miniseries, Khan unlocks the ability to harness cosmic energy and create constructs from a magical bangle, which differs from the shapeshifting abilities that she has in the comics.

In May 2022, Feige explained that the Inhuman source of her abilities in the comics did not "match" with the timeline and events of the MCU, so her powers were adjusted to be related to her Pakistani heritage. They were also brought closer to the cosmic powers of the other heroes in the film The Marvels (2023), which Vellani co-stars in. Feige added that the character's "giant hands and arms" would still appear in the series "in spirit". Tyler Macready, writing for Collider, commented that "the decision to fundamentally reinterpret her powers is an interesting one" and that the bangles Khan discovers unlocks her "ability to create and manipulate a kind of purple 'hard-light'"; Khan pulls off moves similar to her comics' abilities "such as enlarging her fist to punch bad guys, or stretching limbs to make a far leap – albeit with a radically new visual aesthetic. [...] The new powers allow Kamala to do new things, such as create shields and walk on air". Macready stated that this new power set grants Khan cosmic abilities more similar to others in the "Marvels" family and sets Khan apart from the abilities other MCU heroes, such as Ant-Man, Wasp and Mister Fantastic, have. He also highlighted that this decision means that the show won't have to "render stretching, elongating limbs on a Disney+ budget".

Fictional character biography

Early life 
Khan is a Muslim Pakistani American from Jersey City, New Jersey with immigrant parents of Muhajir origin. Khan grows up venerating the Avengers, particularly Captain Marvel (Carol Danvers). She attends Coles Academic High School along with her friends Nakia and Bruno. In her free time, Khan creates various Avengers fan content such as fanfiction, art, and cosplay. She also runs her own YouTube channel called Sloth Baby Productions, which focuses on superheroes.

Becoming Ms. Marvel

Discovering cosmic powers 

In 2025, Khan creates a Captain Marvel outfit to compete in a cosplay contest at the upcoming Avengers fan convention. However, she struggles to receive permission from her parents to attend AvengerCon and instead develops a plan to sneak out with her friend Bruno in order to go. To finish her cosplay costume, she adds bangles sent from her grandmother Sana which gives her energy powers. At AvengerCon, Khan puts her bangles on and it causes her to project constructs of cosmic energy that inadvertently cause havoc. She saves her classmate Zoe Zimmer using an embiggened hand. After the incident, Bruno rushes Khan home and on the next day helps her to control the powers.

Bruno deduces the bangle activated Khan's own superpowers. Later, Bruno, Khan, and Nakia attend a party organized by Zoe and meet the new high school senior Kamran. Khan becomes infatuated with Kamran and stops taking training lessons from Bruno. She also begins to question how her great-grandmother Aisha disappeared in the partition of India and, as such, asks at the annual Eid celebration. There, while Nakia runs for mosque board, a young boy begins to slip from a balcony but is saved by Khan using her "Night Light" powers. Retreating to an alley, Khan is chased by Department of Damage Control (DODC) drones and agents led by agent Sadie Deever; Kamran saves her and introduces Khan to his mother, Najma, the one who Khan had been seeing in her visions.

Learning of the Clandestines 

Najma explains that she and Kamran are part of a group of enhanced beings known as Clandestines who claim to be Djinn that were exiled from the Noor dimension, and that Aisha was one of them. She also reveals that the bangle might be able to help them return, and asks for Khan's help. She agrees, but Bruno warns her that interdimensional travel could be dangerous, so she asks Kamran for more time to ensure that they can do it safely. Kamran assents, but Najma refuses to wait and decides to force Kamala to help them. Khan's brother Aamir marries his fiancée Tyesha, but Kamran arrives at the wedding to warn Kamala before the other Clandestines arrive. Khan, Bruno, and Kamran are overpowered by the Clandestines while Najma tries to use the bangle, which triggers a vision of a train. As Khan and Bruno escape, Nakia sees Khan using her powers. Sana contacts Khan, revealing that she also saw the vision of the train and insisting that she and Muneeba must visit her in Karachi, Pakistan.

Traveling to Karachi 

Khan and Muneeba travel to Karachi and reunite with Sana, who later reveals to Khan that the bangle is trying to convey a message through the vision of the train. The next day, a masked Khan goes to the train station to investigate, but is attacked by Kareem, a member of the Red Daggers vigilante group, who initially mistakes her for one of the Clandestines. Kareem takes Khan to the Red Daggers' hideout, where she learns from their leader Waleed that the Clandestines are trying to break the Veil of the Noor dimension, which separates the Clandestines dimension from the human world, in order to expand and take over. Khan begins training with the Red Daggers to master her powers, but they are interrupted by the Clandestines. A chase ensues, during which Waleed kills one of the Clandestines but is fatally stabbed by Najma. As Khan and Kareem fend off the Clandestines, Kareem kills one of them and Najma accidentally stabs the bangle, sending Khan into the partition of India in 1947.

Khan is able to interact with Aisha, who asks her to guide Sana before dying. Conjuring a projection of stars to lead Sana to her father, Khan realizes she was the one who reunited them. Returning to the present, she finds that Najma's strike had opened the Veil, but it vaporizes anyone who interacts with it. Najma transfers her power to Kamran before sacrificing herself to close the Veil. Sana and Muneeba find Kamala and the latter accepts her daughter's powers. They return to Jersey City.

Protecting Jersey City 

After returning to the city, where Bruno's convienence store Circle Q has exploded and Deever has ordered a lockdown, Khan crafts a disguise using a gift from Muneeba and Kareem's cloth before reuniting with the boys. With help from Nakia, Aamir, and Zimmer, the group stall the DODC agents. Fellow DODC agent P. Cleary orders a retreat, but Deever ignores him and leads a detachment of agents to storm the school where Khan and her friends are hiding, and arrests everyone except for her and Kamran, who confronts Deever. Deever attacks him, but Khan fights off the agents, allowing all of her friends to escape. Deever flees and is later relieved of her duty by Cleary. Khan becomes a beloved figure in her community and takes the superhero name "Ms. Marvel" from her father.

A week later, Bruno tells Khan she has a genetic mutation. Later, after Khan's bangle emits a strange glow in her bedroom, she suddenly switches places with Danvers.

Reception 
Both Charles Pulliam-Moore of The Verge, and Eric Francisco of Inverse, both highlighted Khan's fan obsessions. Pulliam-Moore also highlighted that, "like in the comics, Kamala's faith and ethnicity are important aspects of her identity, and the show explores how and why kids of color like her don't always feel like the world sees them as people meant to become champions." Destiny Jackson, for Empire, commented that "Kamala feels like she doesn't quite fit anywhere, a quirky teen who exists on the fringes of popular high school society. What she lacks in understanding the more practical aspects of everyday life, she makes up for in passionate ideas about what type of person she wants to be, and how she fits into her world." Caroline Framke, in a review of Ms. Marvel for Variety, wrote that "the looming specter of Marvel obligations to come almost makes this series, with its determination to make Kamala an individual and her neighborhood a home, an even more precious commodity. Before Kamala formally becomes Ms. Marvel and gets subsumed into something greater than herself, she just gets to be herself, and that's more than enough." Kimberly Terasaki of the feminist "geek site" The Mary Sue wrote that the origin story changes serve "the medium [Khan's] story is told in. [...] Instead of being a popular fanfic author, she's a no-name fan art stop-motion animator, which shows not only her struggle to make a name for herself but also allows for the show to have a very unique art style to play with Kamala's perspective on her world." Joyce Slaton of Common Sense Media found Khan to be a positive role model, writing, "Kamala is a humble character who realizes she has extraordinary powers and uses them to increase the amount of good in the world, sending strong messages of courage and integrity." Chris E. Hayner of GameSpot ranked Khan 22nd in their "38 Marvel Cinematic Universe Superheroes" list, writing, "Kamala Khan has entered the MCU and we couldn't be more excited. Sure, her powers are a bit of a remix of what we know from the comics, but it's all very exciting. At this point, though, she's still figuring out how to be a proper superhero."

Vellani's portrayal of Kamala Khan in Ms. Marvel was praised by multiple critics. Emma Fraser, for IGN, commented that "Vellani is equally charming as Hailee Steinfeld — you would never know that this is her acting debut." Kathryn Porter, for Paste, wrote that "Vellani shines as Kamala, and it is without question that she'll be able to make the jump to the big screen when The Marvels comes out next summer." Proma Khosla, for IndieWire, called Vellani "transcendent" and commented that her portrayal of Khan "is disarmingly, consistently, potently endearing [...]. Much of this is conveyed with secret smiles and giddy looks, or the abject sincerity of her friendships with Bruno (Matt Lintz) and Nakia (Yasmeen Fletcher)." Anna Moeslein of Glamour praised Vellani's performance, stating, "Iman Vellani is so perfectly cast as Kamala Khan—a.k.a. Ms. Marvel—that it’s hard to believe it’s real." Brian Lowry of CNN found Vellani "utterly charming" across the series. Mira Purnamasari and Chandreyee Ray of Vogue called Vellani's performance "excellent," stating she manages to make the character relatable, writing, "The 19-year-old, who will reprise the role of Ms. Marvel in the upcoming film The Marvels, injects her character with a sense of bright-eyed wonder that makes her impossible not to like.

Differences from the comics 
The changes to Khan's powers from the comics was also highlighted in reviews of Ms. Marvel, with several critics commenting on the new origin's more personal connection. Terasaki highlighted that Khan's comic powerset "would be near impossible to adapt to good effect, even if they had the CGI budget" for it. Kaitlyn Booth, for Bleeding Cool, stated that the live-action abilities "actually look pretty good overall." In contrast, Alan Sepinwall, for the Rolling Stone, called these abilities "more generic" than the comics powers. Pulliam-Moore wrote that the live-action abilities "are only able to approximate the flashy aspects of what was originally a nuanced metaphor in the comics. [...] But the show doesn't go nearly as far with its hero in terms of using its conceit to explore ideas like internalized racism or the pressures Western (read: white) beauty standards put on people of color." G. Willow Wilson, one of the character's creators, had previously described that during the development of Khan's powers, it was chosen not to give her "sparkly, hand wave-y, floaty, pretty powers," which Porter felt was "one of the most important things about her in the comics, and losing that in favor of powers that are, in fact, sparkly, hand wave-y, floaty, and pretty is really unfortunate. Sure, the powers could have pushed the show into the realm of the uncanny valley, but that is also of the point of them. Given the proper amount of time, the VFX artists working on Ms. Marvel absolutely could have figured out how to make things work visually, and the show would have been better for it."

In the series finale of Ms. Marvel, "No Normal", it is revealed that Kamala Khan has a genetic mutation, which implied she is a mutant through a musical excerpt of the X-Men '97 main theme. Vellani confirmed that Khan was the first mutant in the MCU, and Ali said this explains why other members of her family do not have powers. Amanat and Wilson originally intended for Khan to be a mutant in the comics.

Accolades

In other media 
Vellani reprises her role as Kamala Khan in the theme park attraction Avengers: Quantum Encounter on the Disney Wish cruise ship.

Notes

See also 
 Characters of the Marvel Cinematic Universe

References

External links 

American female characters in television
Asian-American superheroes
Captain Marvel (film series)
Culture of Jersey City, New Jersey
Female characters in film
Female characters in television
Fictional characters from New Jersey
Fictional characters who can manipulate light
Fictional high school students
Fictional Pakistani American people
Fictional people from the 21st-century
Fictional vigilantes
Marvel Cinematic Universe characters
Marvel Comics American superheroes
Marvel Comics female superheroes
Marvel Comics mutants
Ms. Marvel (TV series)
Muslim superheroes
Superhero film characters
Superhero television characters
Teenage characters in television
Teenage superheroes
Television characters introduced in 2022